Douglas pine is a common name for several plants which may refer to:
Pinus douglasiana, a species in the pine genus native to a small area in Mexico
Pseudotsuga menziesii, a species native to large areas of western North America and introduced to other temperate areas